Eleazer Wheelock Ripley (April 15, 1782 – March 2, 1839) was an American soldier and politician. He fought in the War of 1812, eventually rising to the rank of brigadier general, and later served as a U.S. Representative from Louisiana, from 1835 until 1839. He was also a slave owner.

Life

Ripley was born in Hanover, New Hampshire. He was the grandson of Eleazar Wheelock, the founder of Dartmouth College, and the nephew of John Wheelock, the college's president. His father, Sylvanus, taught at Dartmouth in the 1780s, and Eleazer graduated from the school in 1800.

Ripley practiced law in Kennebec County, Maine, and Portland, Maine. He served in the Massachusetts House of Representatives from 1810 to 1811, and was elected to the Massachusetts Senate in 1812.

In August 1812, following the outbreak of the War of 1812, he organized the 21st United States Infantry Regiment, and was given the rank of lieutenant-colonel. He was promoted to colonel in March 1813.  Most of the regiment's soldiers came from Massachusetts and Maine. Soldiers from the regiment took part in several battles, including York (in which Ripley was wounded), Sacketts Harbor, Crysler's Farm.

In April 1814, Ripley was promoted to Brigadier General. (Lieutenant Colonel James Miller, late of the 4th US Infantry Regiment was appointed to succeed him in command of the 21st Infantry.) Ripley was appointed to command the Second Brigade (which included the 21st Infantry) of Major General Jacob Brown's Left Division on the Niagara River. At the Battle of Lundy's Lane, Ripley's brigade captured and held the British guns until the American withdrawal. However, he was blamed by Brown for losing the guns during the withdrawal and later demanded a court martial to clear his name.

Ripley briefly commanded Brown's division during the Siege of Fort Erie after Brown was wounded at Lundy's Lane, but was superseded by Brigadier General Edmund Pendleton Gaines. He was conspicuous in the repulse of a British assault on August 16, and in an American sortie on September 17, in which he was wounded.

Ripley was awarded the Congressional Gold Medal, the precursor to the Medal of Honor, for his wartime service. He moved to Baton Rouge, Louisiana, in 1815, and left the army in 1820 to continue his career in politics. He served in the Louisiana State Senate in 1832. He served as a United States representative from Louisiana's Second District from March 4, 1835, to March 2, 1839.

He was the subject of a United States Supreme Court decision, United States v. Ripley (1832). As a result of this decision, Ripley owed the United States a sum of money that he had expended while serving as a Major General by brevet. The building involved in the lawsuit is the oldest building in Uptown New Orleans.

Legacy

Ripley's efforts during the war were recognized by the renaming of village of Staunton, Ohio, to Ripley, Ohio, in his honor. The military facilities Fort Ripley and Camp Ripley were also named in his honor. Other places named after him include Ripley County, Indiana; Ripley County, Missouri; Ripley, New York; Ripley, Tennessee; Ripley, Mississippi and Fort Ripley, Minnesota.

See also

List of United States Congress members who died in office (1790–1899)

References

External links

1782 births
1839 deaths
United States Army personnel of the War of 1812
Dartmouth College alumni
Members of the Massachusetts House of Representatives
Speakers of the Massachusetts House of Representatives
Massachusetts state senators
Democratic Party Louisiana state senators
United States Army generals
Congressional Gold Medal recipients
Jacksonian members of the United States House of Representatives from Louisiana
Democratic Party members of the United States House of Representatives from Louisiana
19th-century American politicians
American slave owners